Maxim Cojocaru (born 13 January 1998) is a Moldovan footballer who plays as a midfielder for Petrocub Hîncești.

Club career
In February 2018, Cojocaru moved from Dacia Chișinău to Latvian club Ventspils. On 6 July 2018, he signed for Petrocub Hîncești. On 18 January 2019, he signed for Sheriff Tiraspol. On 8 March 2022, he returned to Petrocub Hîncești.

International career
He made his Moldova national football team debut on 7 September 2019 in a Euro 2020 qualifier against Iceland, when he substituted Vadim Cemîrtan in the 65th minute.

References

External links
 
 

1998 births
Footballers from Chișinău
Moldovan footballers
Association football midfielders
Living people
Moldova youth international footballers
Moldova under-21 international footballers
Moldova international footballers
FC Dacia Chișinău players
FK Ventspils players
CS Petrocub Hîncești players
FC Sheriff Tiraspol players
Moldovan Super Liga players
Latvian Higher League players
Moldovan expatriate footballers
Expatriate footballers in Latvia
Moldovan expatriate sportspeople in Latvia